Tašuľa is a small village in Sobrance District, Košice Region in eastern Slovakia. As of 2011, it had 201 inhabitants. It is 5 km distant from the seat of district, Sobrance

References

External links
 
http://en.e-obce.sk/obec/tasula/tasula.html

Villages and municipalities in Sobrance District